Alia Sabur (born February 22, 1989) is an American materials scientist. She holds the record for being the world's youngest professor.

Early life and education
Sabur was born in New York City, New York.  Her mother, Julie Sabur (born Kessler), worked as a reporter for News12 Long Island until 1995. She married Mohammed Sabur, a Pakistan native, in 1980. Alia, born on February 22, 1989, showed early signs of giftedness. She tested "off the IQ scale," according to an educator who tested her as a first-grader. As a fourth-grader, she left public school and was admitted to Stony Brook University at the age of 10, later graduating summa cum laude at 14. She also received a black belt in Tae Kwon Do at the age of 9.

After Stony Brook, Sabur attended Drexel University, where she received her M.S. in 2006. 
Alia was recipient of the 2007 Dean fellowship from Drexel University. In 2007 she took a temporary position at Southern University in New Orleans after Hurricane Katrina.

Mathematics career
On 19 February 2008, at 18 years of age (3 days before her 19th birthday), she was appointed to the position of International Professor as Research Liaison with Stony Brook University by the Dept. of Advanced Technology Fusion at Konkuk University in Seoul, South Korea. The position was a temporary, one-year contract which she chose not to renew. The Guinness Book of World Records named Sabur the World's Youngest Professor, replacing Colin Maclaurin's  mathematics Professorship at the University of Aberdeen at the age of 19.

She began her position at the Department of Advanced Technology Fusion at Konkuk University in June 2008 and returned to her hometown of New York early 2009, without renewing her contract.

Deepwater Horizon oil spill
In June 2010 Sabur appeared on CNN and Fox News' Hannity to illustrate her idea, which BP considered as an option to help alleviate the Deepwater Horizon oil spill in the Gulf of Mexico.

Graduate school controversy

In 2008, Sabur filed a civil suit against Drexel University, claiming that the university engaged in fraud and defamation regarding Sabur's pursuit of a doctoral degree. In the suit, Sabur charges that Yury Gogotsi, her former Ph.D. advisor, improperly used her research to apply for grants, and deliberately obstructed her degree. Trial proceedings began on August 9, 2010.

"But that was when I grew disillusioned with the science world. I saw bad conduct and realised that some professors weren’t motivated by a love of science. I fell out with the adviser who was supervising my PhD. I sued Drexel University in a civil lawsuit and the case has now gone into private, binding arbitration. I believe my adviser applied for grants and patents using my ideas, and took credit for them. He denies this and has accused me of stealing his work. Even though the university has cleared me of plagiarism it has still refused to award me my PhD.", says Financial Times article.

This is the second lawsuit involving the Sabur family. In the previous one Alia Sabur's parents brought suit on behalf of their daughter, alleging that the Northport–East Northport board of education, its members, and the school district failed to provide their daughter with appropriate educational services in violation of the Individuals with Disabilities Education Act. Six of the seven counts were dismissed.

References

Further reading

External links
Official site 
AZojomo Research Paper

1989 births
21st-century women engineers
American people of Pakistani descent
American women engineers
Drexel University alumni
Engineers from New York City
Living people
People from Northport, New York
Scientists from New York City
Stony Brook University alumni
21st-century American women